Hasan Ahmed Dar (born 18 July 1989) is a Pakistani cricketer who has played for several Lahore-based teams in Pakistani domestic cricket. He is a right-arm pace bowler and is the son of field hockey player Tauqeer Dar

Hasan made his first-class debut in February 2009, playing for Lahore Ravi in the 2008–09 Quaid-i-Azam Trophy. He switched to Lahore Shalimar the following season, and took 16 wickets from five games for the team, including 7/53 against Habib Bank. Hasan also played two limited-overs games for the Lahore Eagles later in the season. In January 2010, he represented the Pakistan under-21s in the cricket tournament at the 2010 South Asian Games, winning a bronze medal. Hasan took 5/43 against Abbottabad in the 2010–11 Quaid-i-Azam Trophy, and 6/67 against Hyderabad the following season. He returned to Lahore Ravi for the 2013–14 season, and when that team was abolished switched to the Lahore Lions for the 2014–15 season.

References

External links
Player profile and statistics at CricketArchive
Player profile and statistics at ESPNcricinfo

1989 births
Living people
Lahore Eagles cricketers
Lahore Lions cricketers
Lahore Ravi cricketers
Lahore Shalimar cricketers
Pakistani cricketers
Cricketers from Lahore
South Asian Games bronze medalists for Pakistan
South Asian Games medalists in cricket